The following shows the public housing estates (including Home Ownership Scheme (HOS), Private Sector Participation Scheme (PSPS), Tenants Purchase Scheme (TPS)) in Kwun Tong of Kwun Tong District, Kowloon, Hong Kong.

Overview

Cheung Wo Court 
Cheung Wo Court is a Home Ownership Scheme court in Hip Wo Street, Kwun Tong, opposite to Po Pui Court. It consists of 6 blocks built in 1984.

Houses

Po Pui Court 

Po Pui Court is a Home Ownership Scheme court in Hip Wo Street, Kwun Tong, opposite to Cheung Wo Court. It consists of 5 blocks built in 1995.

Houses

Tsui Ping Estate 

Tsui Ping Estate is an estate redeveloped in the 1980s and the 1990s. It is divided into Tsui Ping (South) Estate and Tsui Ping (North) Estate. The redeveloped estate has 19 blocks in total.

Wan Hon Estate 

Wan Hon Estate is named for nearby Wan Hon Street, the estate consists of two blocks completed in 1998. It was built on the site of a former squatter area, which was cleared in the 1970s and left vacant until Wan Hon Estate started construction in 1996.

Houses

Wo Lok Estate 

Wo Lok Estate the oldest existing public housing estate in Kwun Tong District, and the first public housing estate with seven-storeys blocks.

The estate comprises 11 blocks of buildings of Old Slab type built from 1962 to 1966. It was developed into 2 phases. Phase 1 included 8 seven-storey blocks built in 1962 and 1963, while Phase 2 included 3 blocks built in 1965 and 1966. In 2007, the government evaluated the condition of the buildings, and found them all structurally sound. However, structural repair and improvement works were carried out to sustain the buildings for the next 15 years.

Houses

See also 
Public housing estates in Ngau Tau Kok and Kowloon Bay
Public housing estates in Sze Shun
Public housing estates in Lam Tin
Public housing estates in Yau Tong

References 

Kwun Tong
Kwun Tong District